Too Legit to Quit is the fourth studio album by Hammer (after removing M.C. from his name), released on October 29, 1991. Produced by Hammer and Felton Pilate, the album was released via Capitol Records and EMI Records. 

Too Legit to Quit has been certified silver in the UK by the British Phonographic Industry, and triple platinum in the US by the Recording Industry Association of America. The album sold more than 5 million copies.

Promotion and tour 
The marketing campaign for Too Legit To Quit was the largest in the history of Capitol Records at the time, as the label invested $1 million in advertising, and the multi-million dollar music video for the title track remains one of the most expensive ever made.

Hammer set out on a world tour for Too Legit to Quit, but the stage show had become as lavish as his lifestyle. Too Legit to Quit World Tour began with two sold out concerts in March 1992, at the 50,000 capacity Tokyo Dome. Capitol Records was prepared to allow the tour to continue for at least two years, although it ultimately would run for slightly less than that. Loaded with singers, dancers and backup musicians, the supporting concert tour was too expensive for the album's sales to finance. Therefore, it was canceled partway through. 

In 1992, Boyz II Men joined Hammer's high-profile 2 Legit 2 Quit Tour as an opening act. While traveling the country, their tour manager Khalil Roundtree was murdered in Chicago, and the group's future performances of "It's So Hard to Say Goodbye to Yesterday" were dedicated to him. As a result of this unfortunate experience, the song would help advance their success. Other opening acts for the tour included Jodeci and Mary J. Blige.

The large-scale advertising campaign and world tour indicated that Capitol Records was expecting Too Legit To Quit to replicate or exceed Hammer’s previous successes, and were strongly supportive of his career. Given the recording and promotional costs in relation to music sales, Too Legit To Quit was not likely as profitable as Hammer or Capitol Records may have hoped. However, ticket and merchandise sales for Hammer’s Pepsi and MTV-sponsored world tour likely generated massive exposure and millions of dollars in revenue, thus allowing Hammer to sustain his reputation as a very popular performer.

Prior to Hammer's next album The Funky Headhunter, rumors from critics and fans began claiming Hammer had quit the music and entertainment business, or had suffered a financial downfall. Although a couple of years had passed between the two records, Hammer denied this "fallacy" at the time. The introduction to the extended-play music video for "2 Legit 2 Quit" addressed the fact that Hammer must have quit (with Jim Belushi as a newscaster announcing it in a comical way), until Hammer shows up late to a concert dancing and rapping to the hit song.

Reception 
The album managed to sell more than five million copies and two of its singles exceeded 500,000 copies sold.

"2 Legit 2 Quit" proved to be successful in the U.S. as a Top 10 hit, peaking at No. 5 on the Billboard Hot 100. Another hit came soon after with "Addams Groove", which appeared on both The Addams Family motion picture soundtrack, and the vinyl and cassette versions of 2 Legit 2 Quit). It reached No. 7 in the U.S. and No. 4 in the UK. Despite the album's multi-platinum certification, the sales were one-third of those of Please Hammer Don't Hurt 'Em.

Music videos 
Several music videos were produced for all four charting singles released. The music video for "Addams Groove" appeared before The Addams Family film.

The music video for "2 Legit 2 Quit" included many celebrity appearances. It was ranked one of the most expensive videos ever produced. The hand gestures used within the video became very popular as was the catchphrase itself. At the end of the video, after James Brown enlists Hammer to obtain the glove of Michael Jackson, a silver-white sequined glove is shown on the hand of a Jackson look-alike doing the "2 Legit 2 Quit" hand motions. It was a reference to Hammer wanting to challenge Jackson to a dance-off, for rights to his famous glove, which is also referenced on the album.

Andy Samberg's character in the film Hot Rod, pays tribute to Hammer's hand gestures from the music video, with his explanation of no longer being "legit" so he must quit.

Hammer appeared on The Wendy Williams Show on July 27, 2009. He told a story about a phone call he received from Michael Jackson, regarding the portion of the "2 Legit 2 Quit" video that included a purported Jackson, giving his approval and inclusion of it. He explained how Jackson had seen the video and liked it, and both expressed they were a fan of each other. Hammer and Jackson would later appear, speak and perform at the funeral service for James Brown in 2006.

A compilation album of music videos from this album were released on VHS in 1992 and DVD in 2002, entitled M.C. Hammer: 2 Legit - The Videos (102 minutes).

Track listing 

The cassette tape version of this album is considerably longer, with the addition of four songs (two of which are remixes). After "Find Yourself a Friend" there follows "Rollin' on (Oaktown Style)" (5:50). After "Gaining Momentum" is "Burn It Up" (4:28). The last two songs on the album are "Addams Groove" (3:54) and "Street Soldiers (Saxapella Reprise)" (4:56). The total run time is 1:29:00 (89 minutes).

The double LP release included bonus tracks "Addams Groove", "Burn It Up" and "Street Soldiers (Saxapella Reprise)". It omits "Rollin' on (Oaktown Style)". This version also re-arranges the track listing to accommodate for equal side length across the four sides.

Charts

Weekly charts

Year-end charts

Certifications

References

External links 

1991 albums
Capitol Records albums
MC Hammer albums
EMI Records albums